Callirhytis quercussuttoni, the gouty stem gall wasp, is a species of gall wasp. Its galls appear on oaks in the red oak group (section Lobatae) (including Quercus agrifolia and Q. wisizleni) on the west coast of North America.

References

Cynipidae
Hymenoptera of North America
Insects described in 1881
Taxa named by Homer Franklin Bassett
Gall-inducing insects
Oak galls